Ramji Gond was a Gond chief who ruled the tribal areas in present-day Adilabad district of Telangana. The areas under his rule included Nirmal, Utnoor, Chennuru, and Asifabad. He fought against British rule, for which he was caught and hanged.

Struggle against the British Rulers 

Ramji Gond fought a guerrilla campaign against the British Indian government to preserve his Gond kingdom. The British feudatory of the region wanted to capture the Gond kingdom. Ramji took up arms against the Britisher soldiers. His army of Gond soldiers defeated the British forces.

Later, some British soldiers entered the Gond Kingdom illegally and damaged public property. Ramji Gond killed these soldiers. The British Government appointed Colonel Robert to subdue Ramji Gond. On 9 April 1860, Colonel Robert got information that Ramji Gond was at Nirmal village, Adilabad. He attacked and defeated Ramji, who was captured along with his 1000 soldiers.

On 9 April 1857, Ramji Gond and his accomplices were hanged to death on a Banyan tree in Nirmal village. The tree came to be known as Veyyi Purrela (skull) Chettu or Veyyi Purrela Marri.
This revolt of Ramji Gond can be called as the first rebellion against the British in India, which inspired Mangal Pandey to kill British Officers on 29 March 1857 which led to Sepoy Mutiny on 10 May 1857. 

The hanging of 1000 Gonds of Telangana was a more brutal and earlier event than the Jallianwala Bagh massacre. At the time this mass hanging of Gonds did not get widespread attention.

Telangana was an important territory with respect to tribal freedom struggles. As early as 1857, when the Sepoy Mutiny took place, the tribal tracts north of Godavari were rebellious under the leadership of Ramji Gond against the then rulers of Hyderabad State - the Nizam and the British Resident. Ramji Gond was successful in rallying around 500 Gond and joining hands with over 500 Rohillas and Deccanis against these rulers.

Initially, Ramji Gond was successful with his guerilla warfare techniques for over two years in the large forest tracts stretching from Nirmal-Narayankhed in the west and Chennur in the east bordering the River Godavari in the south.

He was later arrested, tried and hanged.

The then British Resident of Hyderabad State, who urged the Taluqdar (Collector) of Nirmal to arrest Ramji Gond, was also unaware of the date of his hanging. He was quoted in a report on October 15, 1860, published in the daily Englishman on October 27, 1860 as:
". what has become of Ramji Gond of Ghoolab Khan, and Najuff Khan, the last of the leaders of banditti. We know of their capture, but nothing more. We require to know of punishments for the sake of example, and we require, whenever that is capital, that it should be inflicted at the city of Hyderabad". (Hyderabad Affairs, Vol. III, 1883, pp. 245-246).

In the same report, its writer stated that 'additional strength' was given to the existing 'force' so that "no person (like Ramji Gond) known as likely to rise up in their place to renew the disorder". It is clear that either the Nizam or the British forces or both captured Ramji Gond and his fellow revolutionaries and put them to death sometime before October 15, 1860, the date of the report. 

Ramji Gond may have been executed around September 17, 1860.

The Revolt

Adilabad District Gazetteer (1976) provides information on the earlier victories of Ramji Gond as:
"In the districts there were many spots where violent anti-British feelings existed. Of the insurrections, the one relevant to Adilabad district was by the Rohillas, who called themselves the adherents of Nana Saheb Peshwa. This insurrection synchronised with the events happening in north India. A number of soldiers, mainly Rohillas, who were disbanded from military service in the north, infiltrated into the Deccan. They were soon joined by the disaffected elements. the Gonds under the leadership of Ramji Gond. To suppress the revolt, all possible measures including the marching of contingent troops, calling in of the 47th Regiment N.I. (North India) forming part of the Bellary column and the posting of a detachment of the subsidiary force under Col Roberts at 'Hingolee' were undertaken. For nearly two years, ie, till AD 1860, this uprising of the Rohillas and the Gonds continued."

The account of the attack led by the Collector of Nirmal against the band of Rohillas, Gonds and Deccanis has been pieced together from the correspondence in the files preserved in the Central Records Office, Hyderabad (now State Archives, Government of Telangana) by The Hyderabad State Committee appointed for compilation of a history of the freedom movement in Hyderabad in 1956 as follow:
". on Sunday last week after 4 am (it was discerned to be 1st April 1860) the Collector received information that Ramji and other rioters were sheltering near a mountain at a distance of 15 kuroh (from Nirmal) and four kuroh from the road. The place where the enemy had camped was not easily accessible. The position was that two persons could hardly pass side by side and even daily necessities like food and water were not available there. With a sense of loyalty, he (the Collector) proceeded with the available force. Suffering untold hardships he came to where the hostile forces were put up at mid-day and attacked them. At first, firing was exchanged for some time which was later on followed by sword-fighting. The number of persons killed on the enemy's side was not known. The rebels consisted of about 200 Rohillas and 300 Gonds and Deccanees. Many of the rebels after being wounded took to their heels. Thirty dead bodies of the rebel Rohillas and others were found. Some Jamadars of their force identified the dead body of Miyan Saheb Khurd, a chief of the Rohillas, who came from Narayankhed. A Sarkheel of the Gonds, whose name was not known, was also killed in this encounter. A large number of rebels were wounded. At first they thought of hanging down the dead bodies of the Rohillas on trees in the neighbourhood but later the plan was abandoned lest it might hurt the sentiments of the Rohillas of their force".

(The Freedom Struggle in Hyderabad, Vol. II (1857-1885. Pages 155-157)

Banyan of Nooses

Legends say that about a thousand Gond revolutionaries were hanged to the trunks of a banyan tree on the outskirts of Nirmal, which came to be known as 'Banyan of Nooses' (fell down a decade ago).

As regards the casualties on the government side, a Sikh belonging to the force of the Second Ziladar, Warangal, and an Arab belonging to Saif-ud-daula's group posted at Nirmal, were killed by the Gond and Rohilla revolutionaries. A Dafedar of the Sikh force, an Arab, two Sindhi Jawans and one other servant were wounded.

A Sowar named Ghulam Ali Khan, who accompanied the Collector's batch in the hope of getting some job, was also killed. The batch got the horse of Haji Ali Nusrath, who, as a result of wounds, dropped down from the horse and escaped. Though the Collector's army succeeded in rounding up the rebels, their chieftain Ramji escaped.

The British Resident appreciated the services of the Taluqdar and directed the arrest of Ramji. Fatheh Ali Khan, Thanedar of Chinnur, was deputed for the assistance of the Thanedar of Edlabad. However, he appears to have taken action against the rioters as promised by the British Resident at Hyderabad in his Letter No. 155, dated April 9, 1860.

Ramji Gond was eventually arrested, tried and hanged at Nirmal. Ramji Gond in part inspired the later actions of Kumram Bheem.

References 

1860 deaths
19th-century Indian people